Cyrtodactylus klugei is a species of gecko, a lizard in the family Gekkonidae. The species is endemic to Papua New Guinea.

Etymology
The specific name, klugei, is in honor of American herpetologist Arnold G. Kluge.

Geographic range
Within Papua New Guinea, C. klugei is found only on Tagula Island (also known as Sudest Island and Vanatinai Island), Milne Bay Province.

Habitat

Description

Reproduction
C. klugei is oviparous.

References

Further reading
Kraus, Fred (2008). "Taxonomic partitioning of Cyrtodactylus louisiadensis (Lacertilia: Gekkonidae) from Papua New Guinea". Zootaxa 1883: 1-27. (Cyrtodactylus klugei, new species).
Tallowin OJS, Tamar K, Meiri S, Allison A, Kraus F, Richards SJ, Oliver PM (2018). "Early insularity and subsequent mountain uplift were complementary drivers of diversification in a Melanesian lizard radiation (Gekkonidae: Cyrtodactylus)". Molecular Phylogenetics and Evolution 125: 29–39.

Cyrtodactylus
Reptiles described in 2008